Coffee Date is a 2006 independent film written and directed by Stewart Wade and released by BrownBag Productions. Originally a short film by Wade, it was expanded into a feature and played at various film festivals.

The film stars Jonathan Bray, Wilson Cruz, Jonathan Silverman and Sally Kirkland and also features Deborah Gibson, Elaine Hendrix and Leigh Taylor-Young. In addition to acting in the film, Gibson wrote and performed the closing credits song.

Plot summary

Todd arrives at a cafe for a blind date with Kelly, whom he expects to be a girl. When Kelly turns out to be a gay man, Todd discovers that he has been the victim of a prank by his brother Barry. Todd and Kelly decide to get revenge on Barry by pretending they are indeed now a couple. The joke soon goes further than they expected when Todd's family and friends all soon believe him to be gay. Despite his repeated attempts to prove otherwise, Todd soon finds himself doubting his own sexuality, and feelings toward Kelly.

Cast
 Jonathan Bray as Todd
 Wilson Cruz as Kelly
 Jonathan Silverman as Barry
 Sally Kirkland as Mrs. Muller
 Elaine Hendrix as Bonnie
 Joanne Baron as Mrs. Orsini
 Deborah Gibson as Melissa
 Leigh Taylor-Young as Diana
 Jason Stuart as Clayton
 Judy Dixon as Ann
 Lisa Ann Walter as Sara
 Margot Boecker as Lisa
 Maggie Wagner as Trudy
 Ian Fisher as Ian
 Kristin Andersen as Mrs. Donovon
 Peter Bedard as Anthony
 Tony Brown as Marco
 Natalia Guslistaya as Christa
 Chris Keslar as Tom
 Eddie Khalil as Goth Guy
 Clytie Lane as Cheryl
 Steve Mastro Jr. as Brent
 Marcus Reynaga as Michael
 Thomas Saunders as Matt
 Spero Stamboulis as Stripper
 Carol Ann Susi as Betty
 Ian Fisher as Ian

Reception
On Rotten Tomatoes the film has an approval rating of 50% based on reviews from 18 critics.

Awards
In 2007, it won the Audience Award as "Best Feature Film" at Sedona International Film Festival

References

External links
 
 TLA Releasing's listing for the Coffee Date DVD

2006 comedy films
2006 films
American comedy films
American LGBT-related films
American independent films
Gay-related films
2006 LGBT-related films
2000s English-language films
2000s American films